This is a list of the Places of Scenic Beauty of Japan located within the Prefecture of Ehime.

National Places of Scenic Beauty
As of 1 July 2021, thirteen Places have been designated at a national level.

Prefectural Places of Scenic Beauty
As of 1 March 2021, eleven Places have been designated at a prefectural level.

Municipal Places of Scenic Beauty
As of 1 May 2020, thirty Places have been designated at a municipal level.

Registered Places of Scenic Beauty
As of 1 July 2021, three Monuments have been registered (as opposed to designated) as Places of Scenic Beauty at a national level.

See also
 Cultural Properties of Japan
 List of Historic Sites of Japan (Ehime)
 List of parks and gardens of Ehime Prefecture

References

External links
  Cultural Properties of Ehime Prefecture
  Places of Scenic Beauty of Ehime Prefecture

Tourist attractions in Ehime Prefecture
Places of Scenic Beauty